Ertl may refer to:

People
 Alayna Ertl (2010–2016), kidnapping and murder victim
 Gerhard Ertl (born 1936), the 2007 winner of the Nobel Prize in Chemistry
 Hans Ertl (cameraman) (1908–2000), German cameraman active during the 1930s
 Hans Ertl (ice hockey) (1909– ?),  Austrian ice hockey player
 Harald Ertl (1948–1982), Austrian motorsport journalist and driver
 Johannes Ertl (born 1982), Austrian football player
 Josef Ertl (1925–2000), German politician
 Monika Ertl (1937–1973), German-born guerrilla fighter in Bolivia

Other uses
 Ertl Company, an American toy maker
 Ertl, Lower Austria, a municipality in the Amstetten district of Austria

See also
 Ertel (disambiguation)

German-language surnames
Surnames of Austrian origin